Legerwood is a village by the Eden Water, in the Scottish Borders area of Scotland, near Lauder, near the Southern Upland Way.

Legerwood Kirk is outside the village and has been there since at least 1127.

Places nearby include Boon Farm, Gordon, Greenlaw, Kelso, Melrose, Westruther, Earlston.

Pronunciation

See also
List of places in the Scottish Borders
List of places in Scotland
List of irregularly spelled English names
Legerwood, Tasmania, a locality in Australia

External links

RCAHMS record for Parish Legerwood
RCAHMS record for Legerwood Parish Church

Gazetteer for Scotland: Parish of Legerwood
Scottish Borders Council: Lambs at Legerwood, Ranger-led walk
GENUKI: Legerwood
Borders Family History Society: Legerwood
Legerwood Farm Trail
GEOGRAPH image: Legerwood Hill

Villages in the Scottish Borders
Parishes in Berwickshire